Feng may refer to:

Feng (surname), one of several Chinese surnames in Mandarin:
Féng (surname) (wikt:冯 féng 2nd tone "gallop"), very common Chinese surname
Fèng (surname) (wikt:鳳 fèng 4th tone "phoenix"), relatively common Chinese family name
Fēng (surname) (wikt:風 fēng 1st tone "wind"), rare Chinese surname
Fèng (wikt:奉 fèng 4th tone "offer"), rare Chinese surname
Feng (chieftain), legendary Jutish chieftain and the prototype for William Shakespeare's King Claudius
FEng, Fellow of Royal Academy of Engineering
Fengjing, the former capital of the duchy of Zhou during the late Shang dynasty
Feng County, Shaanxi, in China
Feng County, Jiangsu, in China
Fenghuang, mythological birds of East Asia
Feng (mythology), Chinese legendary creature that resembles a lump of meat and regenerates after being eaten
Cardinal Feng, in Monty Python's Spanish Inquisition
Feng Office (web application), open source team collaboration software
Feng (program), opensource streaming server
The sound ʩ is encoded in Unicode as "Feng Digraph."